Helio Batista may refer to:

 Helio Batista (footballer, born 1973), Brazilian football forward
 Hélio Batista (footballer, born 1990), Brazilian football defender